Henry Louis Aaron (February 5, 1934 – January 22, 2021), nicknamed "Hammer" or "Hammerin' Hank", was an American professional baseball right fielder who played 23 seasons in Major League Baseball (MLB), from 1954 through 1976. Considered one of the greatest baseball players in history, he spent 21 seasons with the Milwaukee/Atlanta Braves in the National League (NL) and two seasons with the Milwaukee Brewers in the American League (AL). At the time of his retirement, Aaron held most of the game's key career power-hitting records. He broke the long-standing MLB record for home runs held by Babe Ruth and remained the career leader for 33 years. He hit 24 or more home runs every year from 1955 through 1973 and is one of only two players to hit 30 or more home runs in a season at least fifteen times. 

Aaron holds the MLB records for the most career runs batted in (RBIs) (2,297), extra base hits (1,477), and total bases (6,856). The total base record is remarkable in context: at the time of his retirement, he had travelled over 12 miles farther on the base paths than any other player in MLB history. Aaron is also third all-time for career hits (3,771) and fifth in runs scored (2,174). He is one of only four players to have at least 17 seasons with 150 or more hits. Aaron's ability as a hitter can be illustrated by his still having over 3,000 hits even without counting any of his home runs.

Aaron was born and raised in and around Mobile, Alabama. Aaron had seven siblings, including Tommie Aaron, who played major-league baseball with him. He appeared briefly in the Negro American League and in minor league baseball before starting his major league career. By his final MLB season, Aaron was the last former Negro league baseball player on a major league roster. During his time in Major League Baseball, and especially during his run for the home run record, Aaron and his family endured extensive racist threats. His experiences fueled his activism during the civil rights movement.

Aaron played the vast majority of his MLB games in right field, though he appeared at several other infield and outfield positions. In his last two seasons, he was primarily a designated hitter.  He was an NL All-Star for 20 seasons and an AL All-Star for one season, and he holds the record for the most All-Star selections (25), while sharing the record for most All-Star Games played (24) with Willie Mays and Stan Musial. He was a three-time Gold Glove winner, and in 1957, he won the NL Most Valuable Player (MVP) Award when the Milwaukee Braves won the World Series. 

After his retirement, Aaron held front office roles with the Atlanta Braves, including the senior vice president. In 1988, Aaron was inducted into the Wisconsin Athletic Hall of Fame. In 1999, The Sporting News ranked Aaron fifth on its list of the "100 Greatest Baseball Players". In 1982, he was inducted into the National Baseball Hall of Fame in his first year of eligibility. That same year, MLB introduced the Hank Aaron Award to recognize the top offensive players in each league. He was awarded the Presidential Medal of Freedom in 2002. He was named a 2010 Georgia Trustee by the Georgia Historical Society in recognition of accomplishments that reflect the ideals of Georgia's founders. Aaron resided near Atlanta until his death.

Early life
Aaron was born in Mobile, Alabama, to Herbert Aaron Sr. and Estella (Pritchett) Aaron. He had seven siblings. Tommie Aaron, one of his brothers, also went on to play Major League Baseball. By the time Aaron retired, he and his brother held the record for most career home runs by a pair of siblings (768). They were also the first siblings to appear in a League Championship Series as teammates.

While he was born in a section of Mobile referred to as "Down the Bay", he spent most of his youth in Toulminville. Aaron grew up in a poor family. His family could not afford baseball equipment, so he practiced by hitting bottle caps with sticks. He would create his own bats and balls out of materials he found on the streets. His boyhood idol was baseball star Jackie Robinson. Aaron attended Central High School as a freshman and a sophomore. Like most high schools, they did not have organized baseball, so he played outfield and third base for the Mobile Black Bears, a semipro team. Aaron was a member of the Boy Scouts of America.

Although he batted cross-handed (as a right-handed hitter, with his left hand above his right), Aaron established himself as a power hitter. As a result, in 1949, at the age of 15, Aaron had his first tryout with an MLB franchise, the Brooklyn Dodgers; however, he did not make the team. After this, Aaron returned to school to finish his secondary education, attending the Josephine Allen Institute, a private high school in Alabama. During his junior year, Aaron joined the Prichard Athletics, an independent Negro league team, followed by the Mobile Black Bears, another independent Negro league team. While on the Bears, Aaron earned $3 per game ($ today), which was a dollar more than he got while on the Athletics.

Professional career

Negro and minor leagues
On November 20, 1951, baseball scout Ed Scott signed Aaron to a contract on behalf of the Indianapolis Clowns of the Negro American League, where he played for three months.

As a result of his standout play with the Indianapolis Clowns, Aaron received two offers from MLB teams via telegram, one from the New York Giants and the other from the Boston Braves. Years later, Aaron remembered:

I had the Giants' contract in my hand. But the Braves offered fifty dollars a month more. That's the only thing that kept Willie Mays and me from being teammates – fifty dollars.

While with the Clowns he experienced racism. Of a time his team was in Washington, D.C. Aaron recalled:
We had breakfast while we were waiting for the rain to stop, and I can still envision sitting with the Clowns in a restaurant behind Griffith Stadium and hearing them break all the plates in the kitchen after we finished eating. What a horrible sound. Even as a kid, the irony of it hit me: here we were in the capital in the land of freedom and equality, and they had to destroy the plates that had touched the forks that had been in the mouths of black men. If dogs had eaten off those plates, they'd have washed them.

The Howe Sports Bureau credits Aaron with a .366 batting average in 26 official Negro league games, with five home runs, 33 runs batted in (RBIs), 41 hits, and nine stolen bases.

The Braves purchased Aaron's contract from the Clowns for $10,000, which GM John Quinn thought was a steal, as he stated that he felt that Aaron was a $100,000 property. On June 12, 1952, Aaron signed with Braves' scout Dewey Griggs. During this time, he picked up the nickname "pork chops" because it "was the only thing I knew to order off the menu". A teammate later said, "the man ate pork chops three meals a day, two for breakfast".

The Braves assigned Aaron to the Eau Claire Bears, the Braves' Northern League Class-C farm team.  The 1952 season proved to be very beneficial for Aaron. Playing in the infield, Aaron continued to develop as a ballplayer and made the Northern League's All-Star team. He broke his habit of hitting cross-handed and adopted the standard hitting technique. By the end of the season, he had performed so well that the league made him the unanimous choice for Rookie of the Year. Although he appeared in just 87 games, he scored 89 runs, had 116 hits, nine home runs, and 61 RBIs. In addition, Aaron hit for a .336 batting average. During his minor league experience, he was very homesick and faced constant racism, but his brother, Herbert Jr., told him not to give up the opportunity.

In 1953, the Braves promoted him to the Jacksonville Braves, their Class-A affiliate in the South Atlantic League. Helped by Aaron's performance, the Braves won the league championship that year. Aaron led the league in runs (115), hits (208), doubles (36), RBIs (125), total bases (338), and batting average (.362). He won the league's Most Valuable Player Award, and had such a dominant year that one sportswriter was prompted to say, "Henry Aaron led the league in everything except hotel accommodations." Aaron's time with the Braves did not come without problems. He was one of the first African Americans to play in the league. The 1950s were a period of racial segregation in parts of the United States, especially the southeastern portion of the country. When Aaron traveled around Jacksonville, Florida, and the surrounding areas, he was often separated from his team because of Jim Crow laws. In most circumstances, the team was responsible for arranging housing and meals for its players, but Aaron often had to make his own arrangements. The Braves' manager, Ben Geraghty, tried his best to help Aaron on and off the field. Former Braves minor league player and sportswriter Pat Jordan said, "Aaron gave [Geraghty] much of the credit for his own swift rise to stardom."

That same year, Aaron met his future wife, Barbara Lucas. The night they met, Lucas decided to attend the Braves' game. Aaron singled, doubled, and hit a home run in the game. On October 6, Aaron and Lucas married. In 1958, Aaron's wife noted that during the off-season he liked "to sit and watch those shooting westerns". He also enjoyed cooking and fishing.

Aaron spent the winter of 1953 playing in Puerto Rico. Mickey Owen, the team's manager, helped Aaron with his batting stance. Until then, Aaron had hit most pitches to left field or center field, but after working with Owen, Aaron was able to hit the ball more effectively all over the field. During his stay in Puerto Rico, Owen also helped Aaron transition from second base to the outfield. Aaron had not played well at second base, but Owen noted that Aaron could catch fly balls and throw them well from the outfield to the infield.

The stint in Puerto Rico also allowed Aaron to avoid being drafted into military service. Though the Korean War was over, people were still being drafted. The Braves were able to speak to the draft board, making the case that Aaron could be the player to integrate the Southern Association the following season with the Atlanta Crackers. The board appears to have been convinced, as Aaron was not drafted.

Milwaukee / Atlanta Braves (1954–1974)
In 1954, Aaron attended spring training with the major league club. Although he was on the roster of its farm club, Milwaukee manager Charley Grimm later stated, "From the start, he did so well I knew we were going to have to carry him." On March 13, 1954, Milwaukee Braves left fielder Bobby Thomson fractured his ankle while sliding into second base during a spring training game. The next day, Aaron made his first spring training start for the Braves major league team, playing in left field and hitting a home run. This led Hank Aaron to a major league contract, signed on the final day of spring training, and a Braves uniform with the number five. On April 13, Aaron made his major league debut and was hitless in five at-bats against the Cincinnati Reds' left-hander Joe Nuxhall. In the same game, Eddie Mathews hit two home runs, the first of a record 863 home runs the pair would hit as teammates. On April 15, Aaron collected his first major league hit, a double off Cardinals' pitcher Vic Raschi. Aaron hit his first major league home run on April 23, also off Raschi. Over the next 122 games, Aaron batted .280 with 13 homers before he suffered a fractured ankle on September 5. He then changed his number to 44, which would turn out to look like a "lucky number" for the slugger. Aaron would hit 44 home runs in four different seasons, and he hit his record-breaking 715th career home run off Dodgers pitcher Al Downing, who coincidentally also wore number 44.

At this point, Aaron was known to family and friends primarily as "Henry". Braves' public relations director Don Davidson, observing Aaron's quiet, reserved nature, began referring to him publicly as "Hank" in order to suggest more accessibility. The nickname quickly gained currency, but "Henry" continued to be cited frequently in the media, both sometimes appearing in the same article, and Aaron would answer to either one. During his rookie year, his other well-known nicknames, "Hammerin' Hank" (by teammates) and "Bad Henry" (by opposing pitchers) are reported to have arisen.

Considerably later in his career, Aaron coined "Stone-fingers", which would prove a popular handle for one of baseball's more colorful characters, the famously distance-hitting but defensively challenged first baseman Dick Stuart, reportedly "delight[ing]" even its recipient.

Sal Maglie recommended throwing low curveballs to Aaron. "He's going to swing and he'll go after almost anything," Maglie said of the Braves' slugger. "And he'll hit almost anything, so you have to be careful."

Prime of his career

Aaron hit .314 with 27 home runs and 106 RBIs, in 1955. He was named to the NL All-Star roster for the first time; it was the first of a record 21 All-Star selections and first of a record 25 All-Star Game appearances. In 1956, Aaron hit .328 and captured the first of two NL batting titles. He was also named The Sporting News NL Player of the Year. In 1957, Aaron won his only NL MVP Award, as he had his first brush with the triple crown. He batted .322, placing third, and led the league in home runs and runs batted in. On September 23, 1957, in Milwaukee, Aaron hit a two-run walk-off home run against the St. Louis Cardinals, clinching the pennant for the Braves. After touching home plate he was carried off the field by his teammates. It is as of yet the only pennant-clinching walk-off home run in major league history in a non-playoff regular-season game. Milwaukee went on to win the World Series against the New York Yankees, the defending champions, 4 games to 3. Aaron did his part by hitting .393 with three homers and seven RBIs. On December 15, 1957, his wife Barbara gave birth to twins. Two days later, one of the children died. In 1958, Aaron hit .326, with 30 home runs and 95 RBIs. He led the Braves to another pennant, but this time they lost a seven-game World Series to the Yankees. Aaron finished third in the MVP race and he received his first of three Gold Glove Awards. During the next several years, Aaron had some of his best games and best seasons as a major league player. On June 21, 1959, against the San Francisco Giants, he hit three two-run home runs. It was the only time in his career that he hit three home runs in a game.

In 1963, Aaron nearly won the triple crown. He led the league with 44 home runs and 130 RBIs and finished third in batting average. In that season, Aaron became the third player to hit 30 home runs and steal 30 bases in a single season, and the first player to record 40 home runs and 30 steals in a season. He again finished third in National League MVP voting. The Braves moved from Milwaukee to Atlanta after the 1965 season. On May 10, 1967, he hit an inside-the-park home run against Jim Bunning in Philadelphia. It was the only inside-the-park home run of his career. In 1968, Aaron was the first Atlanta Braves player to hit his 500th career home run, and in 1970, he was the first Atlanta Brave to reach 3,000 career hits.

Home run milestones and 3,000th hit

During his days in Atlanta, Aaron reached several milestones; he was only the eighth player ever to hit 500 career home runs, with his 500th coming against Mike McCormick of the San Francisco Giants on July 14, 1968—exactly one year after former Milwaukee Braves teammate Eddie Mathews had hit his 500th. Aaron was, at the time, the second-youngest player to reach the milestone. On July 31, 1969, Aaron hit his 537th home run, passing Mickey Mantle's total; this moved Aaron into third place on the career home run list, after Willie Mays and Babe Ruth. At the end of the 1969 season, Aaron again finished third in the MVP voting.

In 1970, Aaron reached two more career milestones. On May 17, Aaron collected his 3,000th hit, in a game against the Cincinnati Reds, the team against which he played in his first major-league game. Aaron established the record for most seasons with thirty or more home runs in the National League. On April 27, 1971, Aaron hit his 600th career home run, the third major league player ever to do so. On July 13, Aaron hit a home run in the All-Star Game (played at Detroit's Tiger Stadium) for the first time. He hit his 40th home run of the season against the Giants' Jerry Johnson on August 10, which established a National League record for most seasons with 40 or more home runs (seven). At age 37, he hit a career-high 47 home runs during the season (along with a career-high .669 slugging percentage) and finished third in MVP voting for the sixth time. During the strike-shortened season of 1972, Aaron tied and then surpassed Willie Mays for second place on the career home run list. Aaron also drove in the 2,000th run of his career and hit a home run in the first All-Star game played in Atlanta. As the year came to a close, Aaron broke Stan Musial's major-league record for total bases (6,134), the record he was the most proud of since it reflected his overall performance as a hitter and team player. Aaron finished the season with 673 career home runs.

Breaking Ruth's career home run record

Aaron himself downplayed the "chase" to surpass Babe Ruth, while baseball enthusiasts and the national media grew increasingly excited as he closed in on the 714 career home runs record. Aaron received thousands of letters every week during the summer of 1973, including hate mail; the Braves ended up hiring a secretary to help him sort through it.

Aaron (then age 39) hit 40 home runs in 392 at-bats, ending the 1973 season one home run short of the record. He hit home run number 713 on September 29, 1973, and with one day remaining in the season, many expected him to tie the record. But in his final game that year, playing against the Houston Astros (managed by Leo Durocher, who had once roomed with Babe Ruth), he was unable to achieve this. After the game, Aaron said his only fear was that he might not live to see the 1974 season.

He was the recipient of death threats and a large assortment of hate mail during the 1973–1974 offseason from people who did not want to see Aaron break Ruth's nearly sacrosanct home run record. The threats extended to those providing positive press coverage of Aaron. Lewis Grizzard, then-executive sports editor of The Atlanta Journal, reported receiving numerous phone calls calling journalists "nigger lovers" for covering Aaron's chase. While preparing the massive coverage of the home run record, he quietly had an obituary written, afraid that Aaron might be murdered.

Sports Illustrated pointedly summarized the racist vitriol that Aaron was forced to endure:

Is this to be the year in which Aaron, at the age of thirty-nine, takes a moon walk above one of the most hallowed individual records in American sport...? Or will it be remembered as the season in which Aaron, the most dignified of athletes, was besieged with hate mail and trapped by the cobwebs and goblins that lurk in baseball's attic?

At the end of the 1973 season, Aaron received a plaque from the U.S. Postal Service for receiving more mail (930,000 pieces) than any person excluding politicians. Aaron received an outpouring of public support in response to the bigotry. Newspaper cartoonist Charles Schulz created a series of Peanuts strips printed in August 1973 in which Snoopy attempts to break the Ruth record, only to be besieged with hate mail. Lucy says in the August 11 strip, "Hank Aaron is a great player... but you! If you break Babe Ruth's record, it'll be a disgrace!" Coincidentally, Snoopy was only one home run short of tying the record (and finished the season as such when Charlie Brown got picked off during Snoopy's last at-bat), and as it turned out, Aaron finished the 1973 season one home run short of Ruth. Babe Ruth's widow, Claire Hodgson, denounced the racism and declared that her husband would have enthusiastically cheered Aaron's attempt at the record. As the 1974 season began, Aaron's pursuit of the record caused a small controversy. The Braves opened the season on the road in Cincinnati with a three-game series against the Cincinnati Reds. Braves management wanted him to break the record in Atlanta and was therefore going to have Aaron sit out the first three games of the season. But Baseball Commissioner Bowie Kuhn ruled that he had to play two games in the first series. He played two out of three and tied Babe Ruth's record on April 4, 1974, in his very first at-bat on his first swing of the season—off Reds pitcher Jack Billingham, but did not hit another home run in the series.

The Braves returned to Atlanta, and on April 8, 1974, a crowd of 53,775 people showed up for the game—a Braves attendance record. The game was also broadcast nationally on NBC. In the fourth inning, Aaron hit home run number 715 off Los Angeles Dodgers pitcher Al Downing. Although Dodgers outfielder Bill Buckner nearly went over the outfield fence trying to catch it, the ball flew into the Braves' bullpen, where relief pitcher Tom House caught it. While cannons were fired in celebration, two college students  sprinted onto the field and jogged alongside Aaron for part of his circuit around the bases, temporarily startling him. A young Craig Sager actually interviewed Aaron between third and home for a television station, WXLT (now WWSB-Channel 40) in Sarasota. As the fans cheered wildly, Aaron's parents ran onto the field as well. Braves announcer Milo Hamilton, calling the game on WSB radio, described the scene as Aaron broke the record:

Henry Aaron, in the second inning walked and scored. He's sittin' on 714. Here's the pitch by Downing. Swinging. There's a drive into left-center field. That ball is gonna be-eee... Outta here! It's gone! It's 715! There's a new home run champion of all time, and it's Henry Aaron! The fireworks are going. Henry Aaron is coming around third. His teammates are at home plate. And listen to this crowd!

Meanwhile, Dodgers broadcaster Vin Scully addressed the racial tension—or apparent lack thereof—in his call of the home run:

What a marvelous moment for baseball; what a marvelous moment for Atlanta and the state of Georgia; what a marvelous moment for the country and the world. A black man is getting a standing ovation in the Deep South for breaking a record of an all-time baseball idol. And it is a great moment for all of us, and particularly for Henry Aaron... And for the first time in a long time, that poker face in Aaron shows the tremendous strain and relief of what it must have been like to live with for the past several months.

Milwaukee Brewers (1975–1976)
On October 2, 1974, Aaron hit his 733rd home run in his last at-bat as a Braves player. Aaron commented after the game that it was his last time as a player in Atlanta as his contract had expired. While he considered retirement, he said that he was willing to return to baseball for another year. He had also said that he would be interested in serving as a team's general manager, someone who would make decisions and not a “house boy”. The Braves offered Aaron a position with the team when he retired, but the role would be more in public relations, rather than one where he could evaluate talent.

At the end of the season, Aaron, who had a prior relationship with Brewers owner Bud Selig, requested a trade to Milwaukee. He was acquired by the Milwaukee Brewers for Dave May thirty-one days later on November 2. Minor league right-handed pitcher Roger Alexander was sent to the Braves to complete the transaction at the Winter Meetings one month later on December 2. The trade re-united Aaron with former teammate Del Crandall, who was now managing the Brewers. He signed a two-year contract with the Brewers for $240,000 per year. Playing in the American League would allow Aaron to serve as a designated hitter rather than play in the field.

On May 1, 1975, Aaron broke baseball's all-time RBI record, previously held by Ruth with 2,213. That year, he also played in his last and 24th All-Star Game (25th All-Star Game selection); he lined out to Dave Concepción as a pinch-hitter in the second inning. This All-Star Game, like the first one he played in 1955, was before a home crowd at Milwaukee County Stadium.

Aaron hit his 755th and final home run on July 20, 1976, at Milwaukee County Stadium off Dick Drago of the California Angels, which stood as the MLB career home run record for 31 years until it was broken in 2007 by Barry Bonds. Over the course of his record-breaking 23-year career, Aaron had a batting average of .305 and 163 hits a season, while averaging just over 32 home runs and 99 RBIs a year. He had 100+ RBIs in a season 15 times, including a record of 13 in a row.

Post-playing career

After the 1976 season, Aaron rejoined the Braves as an executive. On August 1, 1982, he was inducted into the Baseball Hall of Fame, having received votes on 97.8 percent of the ballots, second only to Ty Cobb, who had received votes on 98.2% of the ballot in the inaugural 1936 Hall of Fame election. Aaron was then named the Braves' vice president and director of player development. This made him one of the first minorities in Major League Baseball upper-level management.

In December 1980, Aaron became senior vice president and assistant to the Braves' president. He was the corporate vice president of community relations for Turner Broadcasting System, a member of the company's board of directors, and the vice president of business development for The Airport Network. On January 21, 2007, Major League Baseball announced the sale of the Atlanta Braves. In that announcement, Baseball Commissioner Bud Selig also announced that Aaron would be playing a major role in the management of the Braves, forming programs through major league baseball that will encourage the influx of minorities into baseball. Aaron founded the Hank Aaron Rookie League program.

During the 2006 season, San Francisco Giants slugger Barry Bonds passed Babe Ruth and moved into second place on the all-time home run list, attracting growing media coverage as he drew closer to Aaron's record. Playing off the intense interest in their perceived rivalry, Aaron and Bonds made a television commercial that aired during Super Bowl XLI, shortly before the start of the 2007 baseball season, in which Aaron jokingly tried to persuade Bonds to retire before breaking the record. As Bonds began to close in on the record during the 2007 season, Aaron let it be known that, although he recognized Bonds' achievements, he would not be present when Bonds broke the record. There was considerable speculation that this was a snubbing of Bonds based on the widespread belief that Bonds had used performance-enhancing drugs and steroids to aid his achievement. However, some observers looked back on Aaron's personal history, pointing out that he had downplayed his own breaking of Babe Ruth's all-time record and suggesting Aaron was simply treating Bonds in a similar fashion. In a later interview with Atlanta sportscasting personality Chris Dimino, Aaron made it clear his reluctance to attend any celebration of a new home run record was based upon his personal conviction that baseball is not about breaking records, but simply playing to the best of one's potential. After Bonds hit his record-breaking 756th home run on August 7, 2007, Aaron made a surprise appearance on the JumboTron video screen at AT&T Park in San Francisco to congratulate Bonds on his accomplishment:

Aaron's autobiography, I Had a Hammer was published in 1990. The book's title is a play on his nickname, "The Hammer" or "Hammerin' Hank", and the title of the folk song "If I Had a Hammer". Aaron owned Hank Aaron BMW of south Atlanta in Union City, Georgia, where he included an autographed baseball with every car sold. Aaron also owned Mini, Land Rover, Toyota, Hyundai, and Honda dealerships throughout Georgia, as part of the Hank Aaron Automotive Group. Aaron sold all but the Toyota dealership in McDonough in 2007. Additionally, Aaron owned a chain of 30 restaurants around the country.

Personal life

Aaron's first marriage was to Barbara Lucas in 1953. They had five children: Gary, Lary, Dorinda, Gaile, and Hank Jr. He divorced Barbara in 1971 and married Billye Suber Williams on November 13, 1973. With his second wife, he had one child, Ceci.

Despite being publicly and professionally known as "Hank," Aaron preferred to go by his given name, "Henry."

Religion 
Aaron was Catholic, having converted in 1959 with his family. He and his wife first became interested in the faith after the birth of their first child, whom they baptized immediately. A friendship with a Roman Catholic priest later helped lead to Hank and his wife's conversion. Aaron was known to frequently read Thomas à Kempis' 15th-century book The Imitation of Christ, which he kept in his locker.

In an interview in 1991, Aaron credited the priest, Fr. Michael Sablica, with helping him grow as a person in the 1950s. "He taught me what life was all about. But he was more than just a religious friend of mine, he was a friend because he talked as if he was not a priest sometimes." Active in the civil rights movement, the priest encouraged Aaron to be more publicly vocal about causes he believed in.

Sablica also encouraged him to "attend Mass every Sunday" during Spring Training, to which he responded with the racist realities of the day: "[In Bradenton], they won't let me go to Mass." Sablica said in an interview that he wouldn't have blamed Aaron if he stopped practicing, and Aaron indeed attended Friendship Baptist Church toward the end of his life—noting in his autobiography that he didn't remain Catholic for very long after converting.

Hobbies and health 
Aaron was a long-time fan of the Cleveland Browns, having attended many games in disguise in their "Dawg Pound" seating section.

In 1986, Hank Aaron made a guest appearance in "Just Another Fox in the Crowd", episode 30 of Crazy Like a Fox.

Aaron lived in the Atlanta area. In July 2013, media reported that his home was burglarized with jewelry and two BMW vehicles having been stolen. The cars were later recovered.

Aaron suffered from arthritis and had a partial hip replacement after a fall in 2014.

On January 5, 2021, Aaron publicly received a COVID-19 vaccination with the Moderna COVID-19 vaccine at the Morehouse School of Medicine at Atlanta, Georgia. He and several other African American public figures, including activist Joe Beasley, Andrew Young, and Louis Sullivan, did so to demonstrate the safety of the vaccine and encourage other black Americans to do the same.

Death 
Aaron died in his sleep in his Atlanta residence on January 22, 2021 at the age of 86. The manner of death was listed as natural causes.

His funeral was held on January 27, followed by his burial at South-View Cemetery.

Tributes 
Upon Aaron's death, the sports world expressed their condolences to him. Many current or former athletes and team owners such as MLB Commissioner Rob Manfred, Magic Johnson, David Ortiz, Dusty Baker, Eduardo Pérez, Mike Trout, and Baseball Hall of Fame chairman Jane Forbes Clark paid tribute to him. Fans paid tribute to Aaron by placing flowers in front of the home run wall where he hit his 715th home run at the former site of Atlanta-Fulton County Stadium and in front of his statue at Truist Park. 

Politicians also paid tribute to him. Atlanta mayor Keisha Lance Bottoms released the following statement on his death:

“Derek, our family and I join the nation in sending heartfelt condolences to Mrs. Billye Aaron, the beautiful wife of Henry “Hank” Aaron for nearly 50 years, and the entire family. This is a considerable loss for the entire city of Atlanta. While the world knew him as ‘Hammering Hank Aaron’ because of his incredible, record-setting baseball career, he was a cornerstone of our village, graciously and freely joining Mrs. Aaron in giving their presence and resources toward making our city a better place. As an adopted son of Atlanta, Mr. Aaron was part of the fabric that helped place Atlanta on the world stage. Our gratitude, thoughts and prayers are with the Aaron family.” 

Georgia governor Brian Kemp ordered flags in the state of Georgia to be lowered half-staff in honor of him.

US President Joe Biden paid tribute to Aaron by releasing a statement calling him "an American hero". He also received tributes from former presidents Jimmy Carter, Bill Clinton, George W. Bush, and Barack Obama.

The Atlanta Braves honored Hank Aaron during the 2021 season by including his jersey number 44 on the back of the team caps along with Phil Niekro's jersey number, 35 (who died one month earlier in December 2020). They also painted 44 in the midfield at Truist Park.

At Game 3 of the 2021 World Series in Truist Park, a pregame ceremony was held honoring Aaron where his son Hank Aaron Jr. threw out a ceremonial first pitch.  After the Braves won the 2021 World Series, Aaron was honored in the design of the team's World Series championship ring, which includes 755 total diamonds to commemorate Aaron's career home runs, and 44 emerald-cut diamonds to represent Aaron's jersey number with the Braves.

Awards and honors
In 1982, Aaron was inducted into the Baseball Hall of Fame during his first year of eligibility.

Aaron was awarded the Spingarn Medal in 1976, from the NAACP. In 1977, Aaron received the American Academy of Achievement's Golden Plate Award. In 1988, Aaron was inducted into the Wisconsin Athletic Hall of Fame for his time spent on the Eau Claire Bears, Milwaukee Braves, and Milwaukee Brewers.

In 1999, major league baseball created the Hank Aaron Award, to commemorate the 25th anniversary of Aaron's surpassing of Babe Ruth's career home run mark of 714 home runs and to honor Aaron's contributions to baseball. The award is given annually to the baseball hitters voted the most effective in each respective league. That same year, baseball fans named Aaron to the Major League Baseball All-Century Team. In 2002, scholar Molefi Kete Asante listed Aaron on his list of 100 Greatest African Americans.

When the city of Atlanta was converting Centennial Olympic Stadium into a new baseball stadium, many local residents hoped the stadium would be named for Aaron. When the stadium was instead named Turner Field (after Atlanta Braves owner Ted Turner), a section of Capitol Avenue running past the stadium was renamed Hank Aaron Drive. The stadium's street number is 755, after Aaron's total number of home runs; the 755 street number was retained for Turner Field's replacement, Truist Park. In April 1997, a new baseball facility for the AA Mobile Bay Bears constructed in Aaron's hometown of Mobile, Alabama was named Hank Aaron Stadium. Georgia State University acquired Turner Field and has since rebuilt it as Center Parc Stadium, in 2017, and university officials plan to build a new baseball park on the former Atlanta–Fulton County Stadium site, incorporating the left field wall where Aaron hit his record-breaking home run.

He was honored before the third game of 2021 World Series.

On February 5, 1999, at his 65th birthday celebration, Major League Baseball announced the introduction of the Hank Aaron Award. The award honors the best overall offensive performer in the American and National League. It was the first major award to be introduced in more than thirty years and had the distinction of being the first award named after a player who was still alive. Later that year, he ranked fifth on The Sporting News list of the 100 Greatest Baseball Players, and was elected to the Major League Baseball All-Century Team.

In June 2000 Tufts University awarded Aaron an honorary Doctor of Public Service. In July 2000 and again in July 2002, Aaron threw out the ceremonial first pitch at the Major League Baseball All-Star Game, played at Turner Field and Miller Park now named American Family Field, respectively.

On January 8, 2001, Aaron was presented with the Presidential Citizens Medal by President Bill Clinton. He received the Presidential Medal of Freedom, the nation's highest civilian honor, from President George W. Bush in June 2002. In 2001, a recreational trail in Milwaukee connecting American Family Field with Lake Michigan along the Menomonee River was dedicated as the "Hank Aaron State Trail". Aaron attended the dedication. Aaron was on the Board of Selectors of Jefferson Awards for Public Service.

In 2002, Aaron was honored with the "Lombardi Award of Excellence" from the Vince Lombardi Cancer Foundation. The award was created to honor Vince Lombardi's legacy and is awarded annually to an individual who exemplifies the spirit of the coach.

Aaron dedicated the new exhibit "Hank Aaron: Chasing the Dream" at the Baseball Hall of Fame on April 25, 2009. Statues of Aaron stand outside the front entrance of both Turner Field and American Family Field. There is also a statue of him as an 18-year-old shortstop outside Carson Park in Eau Claire, Wisconsin, where he played his first season in the Braves' minor league system.

He was named a 2010 Georgia Trustee by the Georgia Historical Society, in conjunction with the Governor of Georgia, to recognize accomplishments and community service that reflect the ideals of the founding body of Trustees, which governed the Georgia colony from 1732 to 1752.

In 2011, the President of Princeton University Shirley M. Tilghman awarded an honorary Doctor of Humanities degree to Aaron.

In November 2015, Aaron was one of the five inaugural recipients of the Portrait of a Nation Prize, an award granted by the National Portrait Gallery in recognition of "exemplary achievements in the fields of civil rights, business, entertainment, science, and sports."

In January 2016, Aaron received the Order of the Rising Sun, Gold Rays with Rosette from Akihito, the Emperor of Japan.

On April 14, 2017, Aaron threw out the first pitch at SunTrust Park (now called Truist Park) at 83 years old.

The Elite Development Invitational, a youth baseball tournament organized by the Major League Baseball and the MLB Players Association to increase diversity in the sport, was renamed the Hank Aaron Invitational for the 2019 season.

Atlanta-area sports teams planned to honor Aaron during the 2021 seasons. The Arthur Blank-owned Atlanta Falcons and Atlanta United FC, along with Georgia Tech Yellow Jackets have plans during their 2021 seasons to reserve 44 for Aaron.  It is expected the Gwinnett County professional teams, the AAA Gwinnett Stripers (2021 season) and AA Atlanta Gladiators (2021–22 season), will also be involved in temporarily retiring Aaron's 44.  (The NBA's Atlanta Hawks had previously retired No. 44 for Pete Maravich.) Also in Atlanta, the Forrest Hill Academy was renamed the Hank Aaron New Beginnings Academy in April 2021. The alternative high school had been named after Nathan Bedford Forrest, a general in the Confederate Army and the Ku Klux Klan's first Grand Wizard.

In 2022, a recording of the WSB broadcast of the April 8, 1974, Braves–Dodgers game in which Aaron hit his 715th home run was selected by the Library of Congress for preservation in the National Recording Registry. In May of the same year, Tulane University gave Aaron a posthumous honorary degree of Doctor of Humane Letters, the first posthumous honorary degree ever awarded by the university. It was presented during the university's unified commencement ceremony and was accepted on his behalf by his widow Billye.

See also

 3,000 hit club
 500 home run club
 Aaron Monument
 Hank Aaron Stadium
 "A Leela of Her Own"
 List of Major League Baseball annual doubles leaders
 List of Major League Baseball annual home run leaders
 List of Major League Baseball annual runs batted in leaders
 List of Major League Baseball annual runs scored leaders
 List of Major League Baseball batting champions
 List of Major League Baseball career doubles leaders
 List of Major League Baseball career hits leaders
 List of Major League Baseball career home run leaders
 List of Major League Baseball career runs batted in leaders
 List of Major League Baseball career runs scored leaders
 List of Major League Baseball career stolen bases leaders
 List of Major League Baseball career triples leaders
 List of Major League Baseball doubles records
 List of Major League Baseball home run records
 List of Major League Baseball individual streaks
 List of Major League Baseball runs batted in records
 Major League Baseball titles leaders
 Ruth-Aaron pairs

References

Informational notes

Citations

General and cited references

External links

 
 
 Play-by-Play Audio of Aaron's 715th Home Run from Archive.org
 
 
 

1934 births
2021 deaths
African-American baseball players
African-American Catholics
Atlanta Braves executives
Atlanta Braves players
Baseball players from Alabama
Baseball players from Atlanta
Burials at South-View Cemetery
Eau Claire Bears players
Gold Glove Award winners
Indianapolis Clowns players
Jacksonville Braves players
Major League Baseball players with retired numbers
Major League Baseball right fielders
Milwaukee Braves players
Milwaukee Brewers players
National Baseball Hall of Fame inductees
National League All-Stars
National League batting champions
National League home run champions
National League Most Valuable Player Award winners
National League RBI champions
Presidential Citizens Medal recipients
Presidential Medal of Freedom recipients
Recipients of the Order of the Rising Sun, 4th class
Spingarn Medal winners
Sportspeople from Mobile, Alabama